Alittihad is a Libyan football club based in Misurata, western Libya. They play their home games at Misurata Stadium. The club's home colours are green and white.

History
Around a year before its foundation, a group of youngsters from the "Alahly Misurata" club broke away, due to disagreements in terms of points of view and ideas about how to take Al Ahly forward.

The club was founded on August 15, 1965, after a license was obtained from the Ministry of Social Affairs. There was much encouragement from the people of Misurata and Tripoli about a new sports club, as it gave the public an opportunity to compete on a sporting level, among other things. The public also promoted interaction between the youth of the two cities, cultural, social, artistic and sporting activities.

The first headquarters of the club was part of the Ben Ismail Hotel in Misurata (this is now a conference building). The headquarters, which was also near the public park in the city, was opened on September 30, 1965, with the support of the Director of Social Affairs. The opening ceremony was attended by many, including the youth of the city, ministers and governors of the city.

This was the first public institution for the club, which was always attended by the youth of the city, who were excited by the activities on offer, and created an amiable atmosphere.

References

Football clubs in Libya
1965 establishments in Libya
Misrata